Richard Henry Gillespie (10 September 1878 – 20 May 1952) was an English first-class cricketer.

Gillespie was born at Morpeth in September 1878. He debuted in minor counties cricket for Northumberland in the 1901 Minor Counties Championship. He played minor counties cricket for Northumberland until 1904, making twelve appearances in the Minor Counties Championship. He later played first-class cricket for H. D. G. Leveson Gower's XI, debuting for the team against Cambridge University at Eastbourne in 1909. He made two further first-class appearances for the team, both in 1911 at Eastbourne against Cambridge University and Oxford University. He scored 10 runs in these three matches, as well as taking 3 wickets. Gillespie died at Balham in May 1952. His nephew, Derek Gillespie, also played first-class cricket.

References

External links

1878 births
1952 deaths
People from Morpeth, Northumberland
Cricketers from Northumberland
English cricketers
Northumberland cricketers
H. D. G. Leveson Gower's XI cricketers